The Emblem of Odisha is the official seal of the government of the Indian state of Odisha.

History
On 3 August 1964, the Council of Ministers adopted the design of the Konark Horse statue as the State Emblem. The emblem symbolises discipline,strength and progress.

Design
The emblem is a circular seal depicting a representation of the Warrior and Horse statue found at the Konark Sun Temple. The crest of the emblem is the Lion Capital of Ashoka.

Historical emblems 
Emblems of former Princely states and Zamindaris.

Government banner
The Government of Odisha can be represented by a banner displaying the emblem of the state on a white field.

See also
 National Emblem of India
 List of Indian state emblems

References

Government of Odisha
Odisha